Nicolás Massú was the defending champion, but chose not to participate that year.

Guillermo Cañas won in the final 7–6(7–4), 6–2, against Juan Carlos Ferrero.

Seeds

Draw

Finals

Section 1

Section 2

External links
Singles draw
Qualifying draw

Singles